Sport Toplumy Stadium is a multi-purpose stadium in Daşoguz, Turkmenistan.  It is currently used mostly for football matches and serves as the home stadium for FC Daşoguz. The stadium holds 10,000 people.

History 
The sports complex, which occupies a total area of over 13 hectares, opened in 2010. There are spectator stands which are designed for 10,000 people, as well as, treadmills laid around the football field for athletes. The sports complex offers  facilities for various sports. It features an indoor swimming pool, rooms for volleyball, basketball, boxing and Turkmen national wrestling göreş. Also, there are open areas for mini-football, volleyball, basketball courts and two tennis courts. There is a sportswear and souvenir shop and a hotel with 50 seats for athletes and guests.

On June 16, 2015 the stadium held a 2018 FIFA World Cup qualifying match between Turkmenistan and Iran, which ended in a 1–1 tie. The match also marked the first time that the national team hosted a game outside of the capital, Ashgabat.

References

External links
 Stadium pictures
 Video from stadium

Football venues in Turkmenistan
Multi-purpose stadiums in Turkmenistan